Events from the year 1876 in Sweden

Incumbents
 Monarch – Oscar II
 Prime Minister – Louis Gerhard De Geer

Events

20 March - Louis Gerhard De Geer becomes the first Prime Minister of Sweden.
Date unknown - Lars Magnus Ericsson founds Ericsson.
Date unknown - Freight Line Through Skåne
Date unknown - Upsala-Lenna Jernväg
Date unknown - The starting point of the hibernation of Karolina Olsson

Births

 21 January – Mathias Taube, actor and artist   (died 1934) 
 11 April - Torine Torines, mechanic  (died 1944) 
 10 November - Anna Johansson-Visborg, trade union worker, women's rights activist and politician (social democrat) (died 1953)
 Anna Sissak-Bardizbanian, reporter  (died 1919)
 Mathilda Staël von Holstein, lawyer (died 1953)

Deaths

 10 February - August Söderman, composer  (died 1832)

References

 
Years of the 19th century in Sweden